This is a list of Cypriot football transfers for the 2015–16 summer transfer window by club. Only transfers of clubs in the Cypriot First Division and Cypriot Second Division are included.

The summer transfer window opened on 1 June 2015, although a few transfers took place prior to that date. The window closed at midnight on 31 August 2015. Players without a club may join one at any time, either during or in between transfer windows.

Cypriot First Division

AEK Larnaca

In:

Out:

AEL Limassol

In:

Out:

Anorthosis Famagusta

In:

Out:

APOEL

In:

Out:

Apollon Limassol

In:

Out:

Aris Limassol

In:

Out:

Ayia Napa

In:

Out:

Doxa Katokopias

In:

Out:

Enosis Neon Paralimni

In:

Out:

Ermis Aradippou

In:

Out:

Ethnikos Achna

In:

Out:

Nea Salamina

In:

Out:

Omonia

In:

Out:

Pafos FC

In:

Out:

Cypriot Second Division

AEZ Zakakiou

In:

Out:

Anagennisi Dherynia

In:

Out:

ASIL

In:

Out:

Digenis Voroklinis

In:

Out:

Elpida Xylofagou

In:

Out:

ENAD Polis Chrysochous FC

In:

 

Out:

Enosis Neon Parekklisia

In:

Out:

ENTHOI Lakatamia

In:

Out:

Karmiotissa Polemidion

In:

Out:

Nikos & Sokratis Erimis

In:

Out:

Olympiakos Nicosia

In:

Out:

Omonia Aradippou

In:

Out:

Othellos Athienou

In:

Out:

PAEEK

In:

Out:

References

Cypriot
tran
Cypriot football transfers